Zola and the Tulip Tree is the third album by the Original Harmony Ridge Creekdippers, released in 1999. It was originally released by Atlantic Records and later reissued by Rhino Entertainment.

Reception

Writing for Allmusic, music critic Dan Lee wrote of the album; "What's missing in Olson's Creek Dipper releases is variety... These songs are interesting yet feel like they could be improved upon with another exploration"

Track listing
 "Zola and the Tulip Tree" (Mark Olson) – 2:32 
 "Lorna Doone's Garden" (Olson, Victoria Williams) – 2:43 
 "Skip to My Lou" (Olson) – 2:36 
 "Cedric Harper" (Olson) – 2:13 
 "Every Stick of Furniture" (Olson) – 2:32 
 "Custom Detroit Railroad" (Olson) – 3:24 
 "Onion River Camp" (Mike Russell) – 1:50 
 "The Hours Before Dawn" (Olson, Williams) – 2:20 
 "Into the Yard" (Olson, Williams) – 3:09 
 "Big Old Sign" (Olson, Williams) – 3:24

Personnel
Mark Olson – guitar, vocals
John Convertino – accordion, drums 
Jon Cowherd – piano  
Don Heffington – harp, percussion
Eric Heywood – pedal steel, vocals 
Mike Russell – bass, mandolin, violin

Production notes
Produced by Mark Olson
Mastered by Joe Gastwirt
Photography by Daniel Coston

References

1999 albums
Original Harmony Ridge Creekdippers albums
Atlantic Records albums